Pedakadimi is a panchayat in West Godavari district in the Indian state of Andhra Pradesh. This village is about 9 km from Eluru, the headquarters of the district. Vatlur railway station and Powerpet railway station are the two nearest railway stations to Pedakadimi.

References

Villages in West Godavari district